Vaumeilh is a commune in the Alpes-de-Haute-Provence department in the Provence-Alpes-Côte d'Azur region in southeastern France.

Geography
It is a small Provençal village with narrow, winding streets which backs on to a hill.

Origin of the name
The most common theory is that name comes from the Latin Vallis Mellis which is translated as valley of honey. Charles Rostaing suggested that the name sounds like a word for mountain and so this might be its origin. Ernest Nègre proposed that the name is composed of Latin 'vallem' and the Roman name 'Maelius'.

History
The village was mentioned, as 'Vaumel', for the first time in charters dated 1171. It was occupied by Protestants at the end of the French Wars of Religion. A 'patriotic society' was created in the spring of 1792, which was one of 21 in the department of Alpes-de-Haute-Provence to debate political matters.

Administration
List of mayors:
March 1989 - March 1995 Louis Touche
March 1995 - March 2001 Jean-Marie Collombon
March 2001 - March 2008 Georges Richaud
March 2008 - to date    Élisabeth Collombon

Population

The inhabitants are called Vaumeilhois.

Sights
 A priory, Notre-Dame de Chane, existed in 1210, and depended on the monastery in Aniane. It fell in ruins in 1469, was given to the Church of Gap, which rebuilt it with mainly agricultural objectives around a triple court between the end of the 17th century and the French Revolution. A dovecote which is the oldest in the department dating from the 15th or 16th centuries was built almost entirely out of large boulders.
 The parish church was built in 1667. It has fine stained glass and marble statues
 The chapel of Saint Marcellin, below the village, was built around 1770 
 There is a monument to the fourteen dead of the First World War
 A tower remains from an ancient feudal manor that was destroyed during the French Revolution
 The town square (Place de Trois Torrents) was enlarged adding a children's play area and a "kiosk" (bandstand). This was formally opened 10 July 2010.
 The "sentier des Contes" (the Tales' Path) starting from Fombeton Bridge is part of the "Trail of Talking Rocks". A special booklet available from tourist offices when pressed to the right rock will trigger an electronic story about the location.
 The airfield midway between Vaumeilh and Thèze is well known for the sport of gliding and attracts many visitors each year for flights and for its restaurant

See also
Communes of the Alpes-de-Haute-Provence department

References

Communes of Alpes-de-Haute-Provence
Alpes-de-Haute-Provence communes articles needing translation from French Wikipedia